Chris Park may refer to:

 Chris Park, former member of English boy band Phixx
 Chris Park (cricketer) (born 1983), English cricketer
 Christopher M. Park, designer of AI War: Fleet Command.

See also
 Abyss (wrestler) (Chris Parks, born 1973), wrestler